Parrot's beak may refer to:

Plants 
 Clianthus, a genus of flowering plants of New Zealand
 Lotus berthelotii, a perennial plant endemic to the Canary Islands
 Heliconia psittacorum, a perennial herb of the Caribbean and South America
 Pterostylis nutans, also known as parrot's beak orchid, an orchid of Australia and New Zealand

Places 
 Parrot's Beak, Cambodia, an area in Svay Rieng Province, Cambodia
 Parrot's Beak (Guinea), a region of Guinea traversed by the Mano River
 Parrot's Beak, a monolith on Mount Pico de Loro in the Philippines

Other uses 
 any tool in the shape of a parrot's beak, for example a type of pruning shears
 ukpe-okhue, a crown of the Benin Empire
 parrotbeak, an obsolete east English regional name for the Atlantic puffin
 "The Parrot's Beak", an autobiographical essay by South Asian American activist and writer Kartar Dhillon

See also 
 Parrotbill (disambiguation)